New Holland Brewing Company is a company located in Holland, Michigan.  The company operates a brewery and distillery, located on the city's northside, with a brewpub and restaurant, in both downtown Holland and Grand Rapids.  The company's beers are sold at its restaurant and are distributed throughout 44 states and exported to Canada, Europe and Asia. After the sale of Bell's to Kirin, it became the largest craft brewery in the state of Michigan.

History 
Brett Vanderkamp and Jason Spaulding, the founders of New Holland Brewing Company, grew up together in Midland, Michigan, and later attended Hope College.  In college Spaulding and Vanderkamp cultivated a love of homebrewing, which would bring them together again shortly after graduation.  Their business plan took two years to formulate, but once complete, the pair quickly lined up investors, and in 1996 New Holland was founded in Holland, Michigan.

Originally, their goal was to produce beer that was characteristically unique to Western Michigan.

New Holland began distilling whiskey, rum and gin in 2005, and selling it in 2008.

On August 23, 2018, New Holland Brewing Company announced that it will be re-branding its flagship Dragon's Milk Bourbon Barrel-Aged Stout.

In June of 2020, New Holland underwent a re-brand, including a new logo and branding materials.

See also
 Barrel-aged beer

References

Companies based in Michigan
Holland, Michigan
Beer brewing companies based in Michigan
1996 establishments in Michigan